This article is a list of historic places in Battleford, Saskatchewan entered on the Canadian Register of Historic Places, whether they are federal, provincial, or municipal.

List of historic places

See also 
 List of National Historic Sites of Canada in Saskatchewan

Battleford